Stefan Kjernholm (13 September 1951 – 28 January 2023) was a Swedish luger. He competed at the 1976 Winter Olympics and the 1980 Winter Olympics.

References

1951 births
2023 deaths
Swedish male lugers
Olympic lugers of Sweden
Lugers at the 1976 Winter Olympics
Lugers at the 1980 Winter Olympics
Sportspeople from Stockholm